Friðrik Erlendur Stefánsson (born 6 October 1976) is an Icelandic former professional basketball player who spent 17 seasons with Njarðvík, winning the Icelandic national championship three times and the Icelandic Basketball Cup three times.

In 2006 he was voted as the Úrvalsdeild domestic player of the year.

Early life and career
Friðrik grew up in Vestmannaeyjar where he started practicing basketball at the age of 16 with a local team called Týr. During a school trip in Njarðvík in 1992, he was spotted by Axel Nikulásson, the head coach of the Icelandic U-16 team, who selected him for the team's games in August that year. He was the first player to play for the Icelandic national team before playing in any official games organized by the Icelandic Basketball Federation. In December 1993, he joined KR for the rest of the 1993-1994 season. In March 1994, he was injured on practice after a backboard of a basket fell on him after a dunk. After starting the 1994-95 season with KR, he joined 1. deild karla club KFÍ in October. He started the following season with KFÍ, but left to join Úrvalsdeild club Þór Akureyri in November 1995. He left the club in February 1996 after failing to break into the rotation. In March 1996, he appeared in two games for Íþróttafélag Vestmannaeyja (ÍV) in the 2. deild karla where he averaged 18.5 points per game.

National team career
Between 1997 and 2008, Friðrik played 112 games for the Icelandic national team. He was selected to Iceland's squad for the 2005 Games of the Small States of Europe but missed the games after suffering an eye injury on practice.

Health problems 
In 2007 Friðrik had a heart surgery to correct an atrial flutter problem. In the previous years he had collapsed twice while playing, in the 2005 playoffs and once with the Icelandic national team. He missed the 2008 Úrvalsdeild playoffs due to irregular heartbeat.

In 2014 he retired from top division play, siding various injuries, but continued to play with Njarðvík's B-team in the lower divisions. In 2015, in a game with the B-team, he collapsed once again and had to be resuscitated.

Awards and achievements

Club honours

Icelandic Champion: (3)
2001, 2002, 2006
Icelandic Basketball Cup: (3)
1999, 2002, 2005
Icelandic Basketball Supercup: (6)
1999, 2001, 2002, 2004, 2005, 2006
Icelandic Company Cup (3)
Winners (3): 2001, 2003, 2005
Icelandic Division I champion:
1996

Individual awards

Úrvalsdeild Domestic player of the Year:
2006
Úrvalsdeild Defense Player of the Year:
2005
Úrvalsdeild Young Player of the Year:
1997
Úrvalsdeild Domestic All-First Team: (6)
1998, 2000, 2002, 2005–2007

External links
Korisliiga statistics
Úrvalsdeild statistics (1993–2007) at Icelandic Basketball Association

References

1976 births
Living people
Centers (basketball)
Fridrik Stefansson
Fridrik Stefansson
Fridrik Stefansson
Fridrik Stefansson
Fridrik Stefansson
Fridrik Stefansson